Shingo Itō (or Shingo Ito, Shingo Itou, Shingo Itoh) may refer to the following:

 Shingo Ito (footballer)
 Shingo Itō (shogi)